Gösta Clarence Isidor Krantz (14 June 1925 – 26 December 2008) was a Swedish actor and revue artist.

Gösta Krantz was born in Ektorp in Nacka south-east of Stockholm. He started off as a confectioner, but in 1945 turned into acting after having participated in a popular revue named Vi som vill opp. He later became a permanent stage member of the well-known revue group Casino-gänget.

In 1951, Krantz made his film acting debut in 91:an Karlssons bravader, and later performed in popular comedies such as Åsa-Nisse, and various television dramas such as Rederiet. In 2005, Krantz published his biography called Krantz från glädjevården.

Krantz died in 2008 in Stockholm of heart failure due to an infection.

Selected filmography 
1951 91 Karlssons bravader
1952 Kalle Karlsson of Jularbo
1952 U-Boat 39 
1952  The Green Lift
1953 Alla tiders 91 Karlsson
1953 Kungen av Dalarna
1953 Vi tre debutera
1954 Aldrig med min kofot eller Drömtjuven
1955 91 Karlsson rycker in
1955 Bröderna Östermans bravader
1955 The Dance Hall
1955 Het är min längtan
1955 Janne Vängman och den stora kometen
1955 Så tuktas kärleken
1955 Åsa-Nisse ordnar allt
1955 Darling of Mine
1956 Flamman
1956 Pettersson i Annorlunda
1956 Syndare i filmparadiset
1956 Den tappre soldaten Jönsson
1957 91:an Karlsson slår knock out
1957 Enslingen Johannes
1957 Mother Takes a Vacation
1959 91:an Karlsson muckar (tror han)
1959 Enslingen i blåsväder
1959 Sängkammartjuven
 On a Bench in a Park (1960)
 Andersson's Kalle (1972)

References

External links

1925 births
2008 deaths
Infectious disease deaths in Sweden
Swedish male actors